The Barracks anarchists were a group of five young adults who lost their lives in a car accident on the night of 26 September 1970, while they were on their way to Rome.

The name derives from the Liberty villa, near Reggio Calabria, where young anarchists used to meet, the so-called "Baracca". The building was built as emergency accommodation after the 1908 Messina earthquake and became a meeting place for the Reggio alternative movement in the 1960s.

Background
Gianni Aricò, his German fiancée Annelise Borth (known as "Muki"), Angelo Casile, Franco Scordo, Luigi Lo Celso, carried out documentation work on two events that took place in the summer of 1970 known as the Reggio revolt. They claimed that neo-fascists from Ordine Nuovo and Avanguardia Nazionale had infiltrated the events, with the aim of using it for subversive purposes. The group began to carry out its own investigation, as part of a national debate within the Italian anarchist movement. They affiliated to the Italian Anarchist Federation (FAI) as the '' group.

When they judged they had collected enough material they decided to travel to the capital to deliver them to the editorial office of Umanità Nova and meet the lawyer Di Giovanni, who had collaborated on the counter-investigation into the Piazza Fontana bombing. In particular, Gianni Aricò had told his mother that he had discovered things that "will make Italy tremble", referring to their "counter-intelligence" investigation on the Gioia Tauro bombing.

Crash
The trip, planned to coincide with the arrival of US President Richard Nixon in Rome, and the protest demonstration called for 27 September, ended 58 km from Rome, between Ferentino and Frosinone, where their Mini was run over by a truck. Angelo Casile, Franco Scordo and Luigi Lo Celso died on impact and the other two went into a coma and died shortly afterwards.

On Tuesday 29 September 1970, the funerals of Angelo Casile, Francesco Scordo and Gianni Aricò took place in Reggio Calabria, while Lo Celso's funeral took place simultaneously in Cosenza.

On 28 January 1971, the Rome Public Prosecutor returned the investigation proceedings to the Frosinone Public Prosecutor's Office which, by decree of the investigating judge, dismissed the case as a motorway accident.

Investigation
At the scene of the accident, the Polizia Stradale investigation established a probable mistake by the driver of the Mini, which led the car to crash into the back of a truck stopped in the emergency lane, with its lights off. The lorry with a trailer, registration number SA 135371, driven by Alfonso Aniello and owned by his brother Ruggero, was at the magistrate's arrival "in the normal lane, all the lights working except for those on the trailer, which were off even though the lights were not broken". Magistrate Fazzioli wrote:

The two lorry drivers involved, according to counter-investigations carried out by anarchists, were employees of a company headed by Prince Junio Valerio Borghese, a well-known figure in the Italian far-right and the leader of an attempted coup a few months after the incident took place. Another of the coup's participants, Crescenzio Mezzina, lead the police investigation into the incident. In 1993, Giacomo Lauro and Carmine Dominici confirmed, to the Milan investigating judge Guido Salvini, the alleged collusion between far-right circles and the 'Ndrangheta and claimed the direct responsibility of the latter in the events of Reggio and in the Gioia Tauro bombing. Carmine Dominici told the judge that:

However, according to 's documentation Bombe ad inchiostro, which refers to documents from the Ministry of the Interior's :

 attests that Angelo Casile had compiled a list of extremists in contact with the Greek junta that was also published by L'Espresso.

In 2001, new doubts were raised about the death of the five anarchists, and the head of the Calabrian Anti-Mafia Directorate Salvo Boemi defined the hypothesis that the incident had been a massacre as "logical and plausible":

References

Bibliography 

 
 
 
 
 
 
 
 

1970 deaths
1970 in Italy
Conspiracy theories in Italy
Death conspiracy theories
Deaths related to the Years of Lead (Italy)
People from Reggio Calabria
Road incident deaths in Italy